Boulevard Hippolyte-Marquès (formerly known as: Boulevard de la Zone) is a street in the 13th arrondissement of Paris named from the  historical military zone.  It has been planted with trees for much of its length of 515m and has an  average width of 8m.  It runs from the Avenue de la Porte d'Ivry to the  Avenue de la Porte de Choisy.  It now forms part of the ring-road around Paris, the boulevard périphérique or le périf.

One side marks the border of Ivry-sur-Seine from which it was  annexed to Paris on April 19, 1929.  On July 27, 1945 it was renamed after Hippolyte Marquès.

The closest métro stations are Porte de Choisy (approx. 300 m) and Porte d'Ivry (approx. 300 m).

External links
Map of Paris (browser plugin required)

Zone, Boulevard de la